The Sonoyta River is a river of Sonora, Mexico.  It is part of the Gulf of Calilfornia watershed.

See also 
 List of longest rivers of Mexico
 List of rivers of Mexico

References 

 
 The Prentice Hall American World Atlas, 1984.
 Rand McNally, The New International Atlas, 1993.

Rivers of Mexico
Rivers of the Gulf of California